John Scudder Sr. (September 3, 1793 – January 13, 1855) was an American physician and missionary. He founded the first Western Medical Mission in Asia at Ceylon and later became the first American medical missionary in India.

Early life
Scudder was born in Freehold, New Jersey, on September 3, 1793, the son of Joseph (a lawyer) and Maria Scudder. He graduated from Princeton University in 1811, and the New York College of Physicians and Surgeons in 1813. He practiced successfully in New York City.

One day, while visiting a patient, he saw on a table the pamphlet Conversion of the World, or the Claims of the 600,000,000 and the Ability and Duty of the Churches Respecting Them. It convinced him to become a medical missionary. He and his wife became missionaries of the American Board, later of the Dutch Reformed Board.

Ceylon
He went to Ceylon in 1819 and was assigned work in the Jaffna District as part of the American Ceylon Mission. He served there for nineteen years in the dual capacity of clergyman and physician. His most important service was the establishment of a large hospital, of which he was physician in chief. He was especially successful in the treatment of cholera and yellow fever. He also founded several native schools and churches including the Batticotta Seminary.  Upon leaving Ceylon for India, he turned over the medical missionary leadership at Batticotta to Nathan Ward.

India
In 1836 John Scudder and Rev. Winslow started a mission at Madras with the purpose of establishing a printing press to issue the Scriptures and tracts in the Tamil language. He became the first American medical missionary in India.  John Scudder Sr. established his residence at Chintadrepettah (Chintadripet). He was in the United States in 1842-1846 and returned to India in 1847 where he spent two years in Madura giving medical aid to the Arcot Mission at the special request of the Board though not appointed as a member of it. In 1849 Scudder returned to his mission in Madras, where he laboured till his death. He took a visit for the benefit of his health to Wynberg, Cape of Good Hope, Africa where he died on January 13, 1855. He and his wife Harriet had six surviving sons and two daughters who all became medical missionaries and worked in South India.

Evangelism
Scudder was one of the most indefatigable distributors of religious tracts that ever came to India.

He published " Letters from the East" (Boston, 1833) ; "Appeal to Youth in Behalf of the Heathen" (1846) ; "Letters to Pious Young Men" (1846);" Provision for Passing over Jordan" (New York, 1852), and many tracts and papers that were published in the "Missionary Herald". He also gave away Almanacs. The tracts were merely an accompaniment to his preaching.

References

American Protestant missionaries
Protestant missionaries in India
1793 births
1855 deaths
American Ceylon Mission
American expatriates in Sri Lanka
American expatriates in India
Protestant missionaries in Sri Lanka
Christian medical missionaries
People from New Jersey